The State Transport Authority was a State Government of Victoria owned corporate body which operated country passenger and freight trains in Victoria, Australia. It was established under the Transport Act 1983, succeeding the Victorian Railways. The Authority commenced operations on 1 July 1983.

The State Transport Authority operated under the trading name V/Line, and provided rail service support to the then Metropolitan Transit Authority which was formed at the same time with responsibility for metropolitan train and tram operations. The Transport (Amendment) Act 1989 merged the State Transport Authority with the Metropolitan Transit Authority from 1 July 1989 to form the Public Transport Corporation.

References

Public Record Office Victoria – State Transport Authority

Defunct railway companies of Australia
Former government agencies of Victoria (Australia)
1983 establishments in Australia
1989 disestablishments in Australia
Government agencies established in 1983
Government agencies disestablished in 1989